Jose Antonio Arizabalo Orobio was a Spanish military,  born in Guipúzcoa, still a child at the age of seven he moved with his family to Venezuela, and played an important role  in the Spanish American wars of independence.

Arizabalo moved to Puerto Rico, beginning his military career there with Artillery commander. In Puerto Rico went to Santo Domingo in 1809 to fight the French.

Already lieutenant, left Santo Domingo in October 1813, for the gun crew of Caracas. He arrived in Puerto Cabello, in March 1814, coinciding with the siege of Puerto Cabello where his grandfather dies. He was in La Guaira, Cumana and Maracaibo, where he must participate in the war. In 1819 he was 35 years of age. As lieutenant colonel of infantry and artillery commander of Fort San Carlos de la Barra in Lake Maracaibo, participates in the capitulation of Francisco Tomás Morales after the battle of Lake of Maracaibo (1823) .

From Puerto Rico he returns to Venezuela between 1827 and 1829 and organized a guerrilla with the title of commanding general of the royalist troops Costa Firme. With little or no support from the Spanish fleet of Caribbean of Angel Laborde, ruled by Miguel de la Torre in Puerto Rico, finally on August 18, 1829, without any hope of success, and after spending many hardships, Joseph Arizabalo capitulates to republican General Lorenzo Bustillos, being reshipped in La Guaira.

A royalist guerrillas continue to fight in front of the indigenous leader José Dionisio Cisneros, who since 1821 had separated from the regular troops, and fought until capitulation to Paez in the year 1831. Bolivar died at 1830 and Fernando VII die in 1833 ending all projects of Spanish reconquest.

See also 
 Royalist (Spanish American Independence)

References 
 Reseña de las operaciones del teniente coronel D. José Arizábalo. Mariano Torrente